Harry Marshall Groom BCL (July 9, 1894 – 1964) was a Canadian lawyer and politician in the Province of New Brunswick. He was born in Bocabec, New Brunswick, the son of John Marshall Groom and Lucy Jane McKay. He graduated in 1922 from the University of New Brunswick with a Bachelor of Civil Law degree. In 1924, he married Mabel Albina McMillan (1894–1982) of Head of Millstream in New Brunswick.

Groom was elected to the Legislative Assembly in the 1930 New Brunswick general election as a Progressive Conservative Party candidate in the multi-member riding of Charlotte County.

Harry Groom died in 1964 in St. Stephen, New Brunswick and is buried in the St. Stephen Rural Cemetery.

See also
List of people with surname Groom

1894 births
1964 deaths
University of New Brunswick alumni
Lawyers in New Brunswick
People from St. Stephen, New Brunswick
Progressive Conservative Party of New Brunswick MLAs
University of New Brunswick Faculty of Law alumni